Jiamusi railway station is a major passenger railway station serving Jiamusi, Heilongjiang. Jiamusi railway station is also an important railway hub that links other cities in East Heilongjiang.

On opening of the Harbin–Jiamusi intercity railway, it was the easternmost high-speed railway station in China. This title has now been lost to Shuangyashan West railway station.

History

Japanese Occupation
The construction of Jiamusi station started in 1935, right after the Manchukuo administration drafted the plan for the city. 
Two years later, Jiamusi railway station was opened to public on July 1, 1937. It's claimed by historians that Jiamusi railway station was not intended to serve passenger traffic, as the station was heavily policed and all passengers in the station were thoroughly searched. Instead, Jiamusi railway station served as a freight hub for the Japanese to transport wood, ore and crops out of the region.

References

Railway stations in Heilongjiang
Jiamusi
Railway stations in China opened in 1937